

Season 2004

The Liga Premier champions for 2004 were MPPJ FC (Selangor). They were promoted to Super League Malaysia 2005 along with runners-up Melaka TMFC.

Group A

Pld = Matches played; W = Matches won; D = Matches drawn; L = Matches lost; F = Goals for; A = Goals against; GD = Goal difference; Pts = Points

Group B

Pld = Matches played; W = Matches won; D = Matches drawn; L = Matches lost; F = Goals for; A = Goals against; GD = Goal difference; Pts = Points

Goalscorers

Season 2005

The Liga Premier champions for 2005 were Selangor FA. They were promoted to Super League Malaysia 2005-06 along with runners-up Negeri Sembilan FA.

Group A

Pld = Matches played; W = Matches won; D = Matches drawn; L = Matches lost; F = Goals for; A = Goals against; GD = Goal difference; Pts = Points

Group B

Pld = Matches played; W = Matches won; D = Matches drawn; L = Matches lost; F = Goals for; A = Goals against; GD = Goal difference; Pts = Points

Note:

 Due to exclusion of Public Bank FC (Selangor) (relegated from Super League Malaysia) and MK Land FC (Selangor), who were suspended for 5 years from all competitions due to pulling out of the M-League, the relegations of Malacca FA and PDRM FA were revoked and both teams remained in the Liga Premier for 2005/2006 season.
 For the 2005/2006 season, the Football Association of Brunei entered a club team, DPMM FC (Duli Pengiran Muda Mahkota FC), rather than the Brunei M-League Team (as until now).

Goalscorers

Season 2005–06

The Liga Premier champions for 2005–06 were Kedah FA. They were promoted to Super League Malaysia 2006–07 along with runners-up Malacca FA.

Group A

Pld = Matches played; W = Matches won; D = Matches drawn; L = Matches lost; F = Goals for; A = Goals against; GD = Goal difference; Pts = Points

Group B

Pld = Matches played; W = Matches won; D = Matches drawn; L = Matches lost; F = Goals for; A = Goals against; GD = Goal difference; Pts = Points

Notes:
At the end of the season Perak UPB merged with MyTeam to become UPB-MyTeam FC.

Goalscorers

Season 2006–07
The 2006–07 Liga Premier season had eleven teams playing for promotion to the expanded Super League Malaysia. The teams were:

  ATM FA
  Johor FA
  Kelantan FA
  KL PLUS FC 
  Kuala Lumpur FA
  Kuala Muda NAZA FC 
  PDRM FA
  PKNS FC 
  Sabah FA
  Shahzan Muda FC 
  UPB-MyTeam FC

The champion and runner-up of Premier League Malaysia 2006–07 were PDRM FA and UPB-MyTeam FC respectively. Both teams were promoted to 2007–08 Malaysia Super League.

Pld = Matches played; W = Matches won; D = Matches drawn; L = Matches lost; F = Goals for; A = Goals against; GD = Goal difference; Pts = Points

 Note:- No relegations for this seasons because Premier League Malaysia was being expanded to 13 teams for the 2007–08 Malaysia Premier League.

Goalscorers

Season 2007–08

The 2007–08 Liga Premier]] season had 13 teams playing for promotion to the recently expanded Super League Malaysia. The teams were:

  ATM FA
  Felda United FC
  Johor FA
  Kelantan FA
  KL PLUS FC 
  Kuala Lumpur FA
  Kuala Muda Naza FC 
  Malacca FA
  Harimau Muda 
  PKNS FC 
  Proton FC 
  Sabah FA
  Shahzan Muda FC

See also
 Liga Premier